The Department for Environment and Water (DEW) is a department of the Government of South Australia. Created on 1 July 2012 by the merger of the Department of Environment and Natural Resources and the Department for Water as the Department of Environment, Water and Natural Resources (DEWNR), it was given its present name on 22 March 2018. It is responsible for ensuring that South Australia's natural resources are managed productively and sustainably, while improving the condition and resilience of the state's natural environment.

Origins

History of the environment portfolio in South Australia
On 23 December 1971, a new department called the Department of Environment and Conservation was created by the amalgamation of the Museum Department and the State Planning Office which was part of the Department of the Premier and of Development.
On 18 December 1975, the Department of Environment and Conservation was renamed as the Department for the Environment following a merger with the Botanic Garden Department.
On 11 May 1981, the Department for the Environment and the Department of Urban and Regional Affairs were merged with the Department of Environment and Planning which was created on 7 August 1980 when it only consisted of the office of its first permanent head.
On 8 October 1992, the Department of Environment and Planning was abolished on 8 October 1992 and its parts were distributed to new entities including the Department of Environment and Land Management which included the entirety of the former Department of Lands which was also abolished on 8 October 1992.
On 1 October 1993, the Department of Environment and Land Management was renamed as the Department of Environment and Natural Resources.
On 23 October 1997, the Department of Environment and Natural Resources was abolished and replaced in part by the Department for Environment, Heritage and Aboriginal Affairs which also included “employees” of other abolished “Administrative Units” such as the Department of State Aboriginal Affairs and the Department of Mines and Energy.
In 1999, the Department for Environment, Heritage and Aboriginal Affairs became the Department for Environment and Heritage.
On 1 July 2010, the Department for Environment and Heritage was renamed for the second time as  the Department of Environment and Natural Resources.
On 1 July 2012, the Department of Environment and Natural Resources became the Department of Environment, Water and Natural Resources after acquiring the roles and responsibilities of the former Department of Water.
Following the Liberal Party's victory in the 2018 state election, the department was renamed as the Department for Environment and Water (DEW) on 2 March 2018.

See also
 Protected areas of South Australia
 State Herbarium of South Australia
List of environmental ministries
Water Witch (1835 cutter)
Friends of Parks
National Parks and Wildlife Service (South Australia)
Australasian Fire and Emergency Service Authorities Council
Premier's Climate Change Council

Notes

External links
The Department for Environment and Water (DEW). Government of South Australia. Retrieved 24 March 2018.

Environment
Environment of South Australia
South Australia
Protected area administrators of Australia